The 2002 WNBA season was the sixth season for the Phoenix Mercury. The Mercury's head coach, Cynthia Cooper, resigned during the season.

Offseason

WNBA Draft

Regular season

Season standings

Season schedule

Player stats

References

Phoenix Mercury seasons
Phoenix
Phoenix Mercury